Deceiver (UK title: Liar) is a 1997 American mystery film directed by Jonas Pate and Josh Pate and starring Tim Roth, Chris Penn, Michael Rooker, Renée Zellweger, Ellen Burstyn and Rosanna Arquette. It won Best Cinematography and Best Screenplay at the 1997 Stockholm Film Festival, and the Special Jury Prize at the 1998 Cognac Police Film Festival.

Plot
Textile company heir James Wayland (Tim Roth) is accused of murdering a prostitute named Elizabeth (Renée Zellweger), whose body was found cut in two. The murder is investigated by tough detective Kennesaw (Michael Rooker) and his less experienced partner Braxton (Chris Penn).

Wayland is a heavy drinker and compulsive liar, prone to memory losses and periods of violence. He is rich enough to access necessary information, however, and he soon learns his interrogators' own dark secrets - Kennesaw had an affair with Elizabeth to get back at his wife (Rosanna Arquette) for cheating on him, while Braxton has gambling debts with a bookie known as "Mook" (Ellen Burstyn), who is demanding $20,000 payment.

Cast
Tim Roth as James Walter Wayland 
Chris Penn as Detective Phillip Braxton  
Ellen Burstyn as "Mook"   
Renée Zellweger as Elizabeth  
Michael Rooker as Detective Edward Kennesaw  
Rosanna Arquette as Mrs. Kennesaw    
Michael Parks as Dr. Banyard
Mark Damon as Wayland's father

Reception
The film received a mixed reaction from critics. Rotten Tomatoes gives Deceiver a rating of 42% from 31 reviews.

References

External links
 
 
 

1997 films
1997 crime thriller films
1990s mystery films
1990s psychological thriller films
American mystery films
American crime thriller films
American nonlinear narrative films
Metro-Goldwyn-Mayer films
Films scored by Harry Gregson-Williams
1990s English-language films
Films directed by Jonas Pate
1990s American films